Holst is a crater on Mercury. Its name was adopted by the International Astronomical Union (IAU) on April 24, 2012.

Holst is one of 110 peak ring basins on Mercury.  To the east is another peak-ring basin, Nabokov, of similar size.  Holst lies near the center of the ancient Lennon-Picasso Basin.

Holst is named for the British composer Gustav Theodore Holst.  Holst composed a musical suite called The Planets, including its third movement Mercury, the Winged Messenger.

References

Impact craters on Mercury